Battle Riot IV was a professional wrestling supercard event produced by Major League Wrestling (MLW) that took place on June 23, 2022 at the Melrose Ballroom in New York City. It was the fourth event under the Battle Riot chronology.

Matches from the event were taped for future MLW programming; the main card aired on November 3, 2022 on Pro Wrestling TV (PWTV), while the undercard would air as part of the new season of MLW Fusion that premiered on November 10.

Production

Background
Battle Riot is a recurring event that was established by MLW in 2018. The event is named after the Battle Riot match, a multi-competitor match type in which wrestlers are eliminated until one is left and declared winner. The match begins with a number of participants in the ring, who are then eliminated by either pin, submission, or going over the top rope and having both feet touch the venue floor. The declared winner of the Battle Riot match receives a future title shot for the MLW World Heavyweight Championship. On March 19, 2022, it was announced that Battle Riot IV would take place on June 23, 2022 at the Melrose Ballroom in New York City.

Storylines
The show feature several professional wrestling matches that resulted from scripted storylines, where wrestlers portrayed villains, heroes, or less distinguishable characters in the scripted events that built tension and culminated in a wrestling match or series of matches.

The main feature of the event is the titular Battle Riot match, a 40-man rumble rules-based match where the winner will receive a "golden ticket", which they can redeem for an MLW World Heavyweight Championship match anytime and anywhere. On the May 19 episode of Fusion, MLW announced the first five participants in the Battle Riot: Lince Dorado, Marshall Von Erich, Alex Kane, Calvin Tankman, and Killer Kross. The week after that, the field included EJ Nduka, Jacob Fatu, Mini Abismo Negro Budd Heavy, Matt Cross, and Ross Von Erich. Bandido, KC Navarro, Lance Anoa'i, Juicy Finau, and Richard Holliday were announced on June 2. On June 9, names announced included Real1, Davey Richards, Little Guido, Ace Romero, Savio Vega, and Los Maximos (Joel and Jose). O the June 16 Fusion, Mads Krügger, Myron Reed, Ken Broadway, Warhorse, and Microman entered the match. On June 23, Gangrel, Arez, Mr. Thomas, and Dr. Dax were added to the match.

Through MLW's "Open Door Policy", several free agents will be announced for the event. Scarlett Bordeaux was announced on June 2. On June 13, Dragon Gate's La Estrella was announced as a participant in the Battle Riot.

Event
Cesar Duran opened the show by calling out MLW World Heavyweight Championship Alexander Hammerstone. After Hammerstone beat Duran's security, Richard Holliday appeared to laid him out with a chair. Duran then made a rematch between the two for later that night, but under falls count anywhere rules. 

Both Bandido, Hammerstone's originally intended challenger, and Marshall and Ross Von Erich did not appear due to injuries. 

The main event, the titular "Battle Riot", saw the returns of Mance Warner, after previous contractual issues that included him asking for his release in December 2020, among others. Former NXT superstar Parker Boudreaux also made his debut in the promotion during the match.

Results

Battle Riot match entrances and eliminations

Notes

References

External links

Battle Riot
2022 in professional wrestling
June 2022 events in the United States
Professional wrestling in New York City
2022 American television episodes
2020s American television specials
Events in New York City